Zenatello is an Italian surname. Notable people with the surname include:

 Alessandro Zenatello (1891–1977), Italian painter
 Giovanni Zenatello (1876–1949), Italian opera singer

Italian-language surnames